Khvajegi (also Romanized as Khvājegī; also known as Khvājeh, Khvājehgī, and Khvājehi) is a village in Barakuh Rural District, Jolgeh-e Mazhan District, Khusf County, South Khorasan Province, Iran. At the 2006 census, its population was 47, in 14 families.

References 

Populated places in Khusf County